Nosebleed Weekend is the fifth studio album by American punk rock band The Coathangers. It was released on April 15, 2016 on Suicide Squeeze Records.

Critical reception

Reviews for Nosebleed Weekend were generally favorable. On Metacritic, the album has a rating of 66 out of 100 based on 9 reviews, indicating "generally favorable reviews". Mark Deming, writing for Allmusic, gave the album 3.5 out of 5 stars, saying of the Coathangers that "If their rock & roll is still on the minimal side [on this album], it's delivered with capable skill and a sense of drama."

Accolades

Track listing

Personnel
Julia Kugel (Crook Kid Coathanger) – Guitar, vocals
Stephanie Luke (Rusty Coathanger) – Drums, vocals
Meredith Franco (Minnie Coathanger) – Bass guitar, vocals
Ryan Frederiksen – Assistant
Nic Jodoin – Engineer, producer
Chris Maciel – Assistant Engineer
Matt Odom – Design, photography
Jared Swilley – Vocals

References

The Coathangers albums
Suicide Squeeze Records albums
2016 albums